Stephen Watkin (born 16 June 1971) is a Welsh former professional footballer who played as a striker. He is best known for the goal he scored to secure a 2–1 victory for Wrexham over Arsenal in a FA Cup third round tie in 1992. At the time Arsenal were the reigning Division One champions, whilst Wrexham were a Division Four side. He later signed for Swansea City for £108,000, before finishing his career in the Welsh Premier League. He later became an accountant for a local firm.

References

1971 births
Living people
Welsh footballers
Footballers from Wrexham
Wrexham A.F.C. players
English Football League players
Cymru Premier players
Swansea City A.F.C. players
Caernarfon Town F.C. players
Cefn Druids A.F.C. players
Association football forwards